Luthrodes is a genus of butterflies in the family Lycaenidae erected by Hamilton Herbert Druce in 1895. Its species are found in Asia and in Oceania.

Species
Listed alphabetically:

 Luthrodes boopis (Fruhstorfer, 1897) Indonesia (Misool, Waigeo, Sulawesi, Banggai)
 Luthrodes buruana (Holland, 1900) Indonesia (Buru, Serang, Waigeu, Obi Islands)
 Luthrodes cleotas (Guérin-Méneville, [1831]) New Guinea, Bismarck Archipelago, Solomon Islands, Aru, Timor, Wetar
 Luthrodes contracta (Butler, 1880) – small Cupid
 Luthrodes ella (Butler, 1881) South Central Asia
 Luthrodes galba (Lederer, 1855) – Persian grass blue
 Luthrodes mindora (C. Felder & R. Felder, [1865]) Philippines
 Luthrodes pandava (Horsfield, [1829]) – plains Cupid
 Luthrodes peripatria (Hsu, 1980) Taiwan

References

External links

Polyommatini
Lycaenidae genera